Dieter Voigt (born 18 February 1939) is a German ice hockey player, who competed for SC Dynamo Berlin. He won the bronze medal with the East German national ice hockey team at the 1966 European Championships.
 Voigt also competed for East Germany at the 1968 Winter Olympics in Grenoble.

References 

1939 births
Living people
People from Altenberg, Saxony
German ice hockey players
Sportspeople from Saxony
Olympic ice hockey players of East Germany
Ice hockey players at the 1968 Winter Olympics
SC Dynamo Berlin (ice hockey) players